Achyra rantalis, the garden webworm, is a moth of the family Crambidae described by Achille Guenée in 1854. It is found in North America, where it has been recorded from Maine to southern Quebec and Ontario, south to Florida and Mexico. It has also been recorded from Iowa, Colorado, California and the West Indies. Its habitat consists of fields and gardens.

There may be up to four generations per year in the south.

The larvae feed on the leaves of various low-growing plants, including alfalfa, beans, clover, corn, cotton, peas and strawberries.

References

Moths described in 1854
Moths of North America
Pyraustinae
Taxa named by Achille Guenée